Wendy Williams: What a Mess! is a 2021 American television documentary about the life of Wendy Williams. It was released on Lifetime on January 30, 2021.

Production
In July 2019, it was announced Lifetime had ordered a documentary film revolving around the life of Wendy Williams, with Williams set to star and executive produce, with Entertainment One and Creature Films set to produce. Tara Long, Mark Ford, Kevin Lopez, Sarah Girgis and Joie Jacoby. Brie Miranda Bryant and Gena McCarthy serve as executive producers for Lifetime. Williams and executives at Lifetime went through a list of names to be interviewed in the film, if selected Williams would contact them and tell them not to hold back. No topics were off limits to be included in the film.

References

External links
 

American documentary films
2021 documentary films
Entertainment One films
Lifetime (TV network) original programming